Stephen Joseph Korcheck (August 11, 1932 – August 26, 2016) was an American professional baseball player. A catcher, he appeared in 58 games over four seasons (1954–1955; 1958–59) for the Washington Senators of Major League Baseball.

He joined the Senators from nearby George Washington University, where he starred in baseball and football.  Drafted by the San Francisco 49ers of the National Football League in 1954 (third round, 35th overall selection), he chose a career in baseball instead.  Interrupted by military service that cost him the 1956 and 1957 seasons, that career lasted for five seasons, concluding in 1960.  All told, Korcheck batted .159 in 153 MLB at bats, with 23 hits, including six doubles and one triple.

From 1980 to 1997, Korcheck served as president of State College of Florida, Manatee–Sarasota.

He received a distinguished alumni achievement award from GWU in 1993.

See also
1954 National Football League Draft

References

External links

1932 births
2016 deaths
Baseball players from Pennsylvania
Charleston Senators players
Charlotte Hornets (baseball) players
Chattanooga Lookouts players
George Washington Colonials football players
George Washington Colonials baseball coaches
George Washington Colonials baseball players
Major League Baseball catchers
Miami Marlins (IL) players
Washington Senators (1901–1960) players